Lüshunkou District (also Lyushunkou District) is a district of Dalian, Liaoning province, China. Also formerly called Lüshun City or literally Lüshun Port, it was formerly known as both Port Arthur and Ryojun.

Lüshunkou is located at the extreme southern tip of the Liaodong Peninsula. It has an excellent natural harbor, the possession and control of which became a casus belli of the Russo-Japanese War (1904–05). Japanese and then Russian administration was established in 1895 and continued until 1905 when control was ceded to Japan. During that period, it was world-famous and was more significant than the other port on the peninsula, Dalian proper.

Toponym
In English-language diplomatic, news, and historical writings, it was known as Port Arthur after a British Royal Navy Lieutenant named William Arthur who surveyed the harbor in the gunboat HMS Algerine in 1860.  At that time Lüshun was an unfortified fishing village.

During the period when the Japanese Empire controlled and administered the Liaodong (formerly Liaotung) Peninsula it was called , the Japanese pronunciation of the Chinese characters in the city's name. After the Japanese defeat in World War II, the city was under the administration of the Soviet Union, which rented the port from China, until 1950. Although the Soviets presented the port to the new People's Republic of China in 1950, Soviet Armed Forces troops remained in the city until 1955.

Geography

Central Dalian is some  farther up the coast, sprawling around the narrowest neck of the Liaodong Peninsula, whereas Lüshun occupies its southern tip. (See Landsat Map below Zoomed – Lüshun City surrounds the lake-like structure clearly visible near the peninsular tip—the lake-like feature is the inner natural harbour of the port, a very well-sheltered and fortifiable harbour to 19th century eyes.)

The Liaodong Peninsula is located northwest in relation to Korea, the Yellow Sea to its southeast, the Korea Bay to its due east, and the Bohai Sea (or Gulf) to its west. Beijing is almost directly (due west-northwest) across the Bo Hai Gulf from the port city.

Climate

History

In the late 1880s, the German company Krupp was contracted by the Qing dynasty to build a series of fortifications around Port Arthur. Reportedly, this was after local contractors had "made an extensive bungle of the job".

Port Arthur first came into international prominence during the First Sino-Japanese War (1894–1895). Following Japan's defeat of Imperial Chinese Army troops at the Battle of Pyongyang in Korea in September 1894, the Japanese First and Second Armies converged on the Liaodong Peninsula by land and sea. Imperial Japanese Armed Forces war planners, ambitious for control of the Liaodong Peninsula and Port Arthur and also cognizant of that port's strategic position controlling the northern Yellow Sea routes and the passage to Tianjin, were determined to seize it.

Following only token resistance during the day and night of 20–21 November 1894, Japanese troops entered the city on the morning of 21 November. Several Western newspaper correspondents present at the time related the widespread massacre of Chinese inhabitants of the city by the victorious Imperial Japanese Army troops, apparently in response to the murderous treatment the Chinese had shown Japanese prisoners of war at Pyongyang and elsewhere. Foremost among the correspondents was James Creelman of the New York World.  Though at least one American correspondent present completely contradicted Creelman's account, it is alleged that the Japanese troops "indiscriminately killed" thousands of Chinese soldiers and civilians, and the story of a Japanese massacre soon spread among the Western public, damaging Japan's public image and the movement in the United States to renegotiate the unequal treaties between that country and Japan.  The event came to be known as the Port Arthur massacre.

An account of a US sailor who visited the port in the weeks prior to the attack commented that the Chinese soldiers were "ridiculous". They lacked any semblance of military bearing, their dress was unkempt and untidy, and they wandered about the place with little in the way of direction or smartness associated with professional soldiers. He stated that at the time, the garrison numbered approximately 20,000 soldiers, but from his estimation, it should have had between 30,000 and 40,000 men stationed there. He opined that the Japanese could have taken the port with one third of its force, but that against disciplined soldiers, the place should have been impenetrable.

Japan went on to occupy Port Arthur and to seize control of the whole Liaodong Peninsula as spoils of war. As part of the terms of the 1895 Treaty of Shimonoseki concluding the war, Japan was granted the Liaodong Peninsula but had to cede the territory when threatened jointly with war by France, Germany and Russia in what is called the Triple Intervention of 1895. This was seen as a great humiliation in Japan.

Russian base in Port Arthur 

Two years later, the Russian Empire coerced a lease of the Liaodong Peninsula from China and gained railroad right-of-way to join the Liaodong Peninsula to the Chinese Eastern Railway with a line running from Port Arthur and nearby Dalny (Dalian) to the Chinese city of Harbin (see Kwantung Leased Territory), and systematically began to fortify the town and harbor at Port Arthur. This railway from Port Arthur to Harbin became a southern branch of the Chinese Eastern Railway (not to be confused with the South Manchurian Railway, the name of a company that undertook its management during the later Japanese period after 1905). Tsar Nicholas II believed this acquisition of a Pacific port would enhance Russian security, and extend its economic influence. He was also falsely informed that the British Empire was considering seizing the port. All this was an additional goad to an already seething Japan. It was a hard lesson in international geopolitics Japan would not soon forget.

The Russian town of Dalny (Dalien/Dalian) was undeveloped in this era prior to 1898 when the Russian Tsar Nicholas II founded the town of Dalny (sometimes Dalney). In 1902, the Russian viceroy de-emphasized Dalny (building a palace and cultural edifices instead at Port Arthur), except as a commercial port while continuing the development of manufacturing.

Russo-Japanese War (1904–1905) 
Ten years later, Port Arthur again played a central role in war in China. After the Boxer Rebellion (1900–01) had been extinguished by an international Eight-Nation Alliance of troops, the Imperial Russian Army refused to withdraw its reinforcements from Manchuria and instead began to fortify and garrison the entire route along the Southern Manchurian Railway. With this development, Japan proposed the two powers meet and discuss their respective roles in eastern Manchuria, as the area was considered being in their respective spheres of influence.  Talks were conducted between 1902 and 1904. While numerous proposals and agreement papers were generated between the two powers, Russia continued the de facto annexation of territory through fortification and garrison, if not de jure; while employing stalling tactics in its negotiations. In the end, with over two years of intensive bilateral negotiations having gotten nowhere in clarifying each country's rights, prerogatives, and interests in inner Manchuria, Japan attacked Port Arthur and the Russian fleet without declaring war in February 1904.

The Battle of Port Arthur

The Battle of Port Arthur, the opening battle of the Russo-Japanese War, was fought in the heavily fortified harbor of the town of Port Arthur/Lüshun on 9 February 1904 when the Japanese attacked at night with torpedoes, followed by a brief daylight skirmish by major surface combatants.

By the end of July 1904, the Japanese army had pushed down the Liaodong peninsula and was at the outer defenses of Port Arthur. The fact that Japanese forces had closed to within artillery range of the harbor in early August 1904 led directly to the naval Battle of the Yellow Sea which solidified Japan's command of the sea, where her fleets continued to blockade the harbor. Virtually all the battles of the war until July 1904 were strategic battles for territorial gain or position leading to the investment and siege of the port city.

The port eventually fell 2 January 1905 after a long train of battles on land and sea during which the Japanese occupied the whole of the Korean Peninsula, split the Russian Army, devastated the Imperial Russian Navy, and cut off the source of supplies on the railway from Harbin, culminating in the bloody battle known as the Siege of Port Arthur (June–January; some sources place the siege start in late July, a technical difference due to definitions).

The Japanese-controlled Ryojun City had 40 districts.

Post war administration 

The Chinese Lüshun City was established on 25 November 1945 to replace Ryojun. The city was a subdivision of a larger Lüda City and contained 40 villages in 3 districts: Dazhong, Wenhua, and Guangming. In January 1946, Wenhua was merged into Dazhong, and the 40 villages were reduced to 23 communes. In January 1948, the remaining two districts were merged into one: Shinei, with 12 communes.

Under the Sino-Soviet Treaty of Friendship and Alliance signed by Joseph Stalin and Chiang Kai-shek, the Republic of China agreed to allow the Soviet Navy to maintain a base there in exchange for Soviet diplomatic recognition of the Nationalist government. However, the USSR later used the port to assist the Chinese Communist Party's People's Liberation Army during the Chinese Civil War, leading to the Kuomintang's overthrow. 

On 7 January 1960, Lüshun City was renamed Lüshunkou District, still under Lüda. In 1981, Lüda was renamed Dalian, with Lüshunkou remaining a constituent district. In 1985, 7 of Lüshunkou's 9 townships were upgraded to towns.

Lüshunkou District administers 9 subdistricts; all of the former towns were either abolished, merged or converted into subdistricts themselves. 

Dengfeng Subdistrict
Desheng Subdistrict
Shuishiying Subdistrict
Longwangtang Subdistrict
Tieshan Subdistrict
Shuangdaowan Subdistrict
Sanjianpu Subdistrict
Changcheng Subdistrict
Longtou Subdistrict

The city's southern half along Lüshun South Road, central Lüshun and the Naval Port zone continue to be off-limits to foreigners although Lüshunkou District is thoroughly modernized. The World Peace Park opened on the western coast of Lüshun, becoming a sightseeing spot.

The universities in downtown Dalian are being relocated to Lüshunkou. Dalian Jiaotong University (formerly Dalian Railroad University) moved its software school to the area near the new port, and the Dalian University of Foreign Languages and Dalian Medical University relocated their main campuses to the eastern slope of Baiying Mountain, on Lüshun South Road. Dalian Fisheries University is in the process of moving its English and Japanese language schools to Daheishi, on Lüshun North Road.  From late 2006, Sinorail has operated the Bohai Train Ferry between Lüshun, Dalian, and Yantai, Shandong.

The historic and modern names, translated into English, of landmark facilities in Lüshun are as follows:

Education
Liaoning University of International Business and Economics

See also
 Kantō Shrine
 Rail transport in China
 Shuishiying
 Twenty-One Demands

References

Citations

Sources 

  "Lüshun under Russian Rule" (in Japanese; Lüshun Library, 1936), as quoted in "Lüshun under Russian Rule" (Abridged) in "Journal Commemorating the 95th Anniversary of Lüshun Institute of Technology" (in Japanese; Tokyo, 2006).
 F.R. Sedwick, (R.F.A.), The Russo-Japanese War, 1909, The Macmillan Company, N.Y.
 Colliers (Ed.), The Russo-Japanese War, 1904, P.F. Collier & Son, New York
 Dennis and Peggy Warner, The Tide at Sunrise, 1974, Charterhouse, New York
 William Henry Chamberlain, Japan Over Asia, 1937, Little, Brown, and Company, Boston
 Tom McKnight, PhD, et al.; Geographica (ATLAS), Barnes and Noble Books and Random House, New York, 1999–2004, 3rd revision,

External links
 Official site

Districts of Dalian
Populated coastal places in China
Port cities and towns in China
Yellow Sea
China–Soviet Union relations